The 2011 FIA GT1 World Championship season was the second season of the SRO Group's FIA GT1 World Championship, an auto racing series for grand tourer cars complying with Fédération Internationale de l'Automobile (FIA) GT1 regulations. The championship comprised two titles: GT1 World Champion for Drivers and GT1 World Champion for Teams. Five of the six manufacturers represented in the 2010 championship returned for the second season, however Maserati was not represented and 2010 Teams World Champions Vitaphone Racing Team did not defend their title.

The season commenced at the Yas Marina Circuit in Abu Dhabi on 25–26 March and ended at the Potrero de los Funes Circuit in Argentina on 4–6 November.  The ten event season included an inaugural race at the Ordos International Circuit in China.  Germans Lucas Luhr and Michael Krumm of the JR Motorsports team won the World Drivers' Championship after earning four race victories, while Hexis AMR won the Teams' Championship.

Calendar
A ten-event calendar was announced at the FIA World Motor Sport Council meeting on 10 December 2010.  The Ordos International Circuit of China gave the series a fourth event outside Europe, replacing the former Czech round at Brno.  Several national events were moved to new circuits; Zolder replaced Spa-Francorchamps in Belgium and the Sachsenring replaced the Nürburgring in Germany.

The Autódromo Internacional de Curitiba was originally planned as a Brazilian round for the championship, but was cancelled mid-season.  At the behest of the SRO Group, the FIA approved a replacement event at the Goldenport Park Circuit as a second Chinese round for the series, scheduled a week after the Ordos event.  A day after the Goldenport round, the Beijing GT1 World Supercars exhibition event was held in the Olympic Green in Beijing and featured a short street race.

Entries

Manufacturers
2011 was the final season in which the Maserati MC12 GT1, Corvette C6.R, and Aston Martin DBR9 were eligible for the championship. The three were running under a two-year waiver to meet homologation requirements.  In June 2010, Aurora Racing Designs announced plans to develop a GT1 car based on the BMW Alpina B6, based on the existing B6 GT3 which races under FIA GT3 regulations.  This project did not however come to fruition and no additional companies joined the six approved manufacturers. All of the Maserati teams decided to sit out for the last approved season, leaving the championship with five active manufacturers.

In February 2011 the SRO Group announced that 18 entries had been received for the 2011 season, but that the deadline for entries had been extended in order to allow possible negotiation for further teams.  Aston Martin, Ford, Nissan, and Lamborghini were all confirmed as having two teams entered, while a fifth manufacturer was seeking the required second team necessary for entry.  In March the FIA announced an entry of 20 cars, with Corvette joining the other four manufacturers.

Teams
Several of the twelve teams which competed in 2010 announced their intentions not to return for 2011.  This included Matech Competition, who was moving to concentrate on development of the Ford GT for other racing series.  Hegersport and Phoenix Racing also announced they would not be involved in FIA GT1 in 2011, while Reiter's Lamborghinis had been sold.  Defending GT1 World Champions Vitaphone Racing Team had moved to the new Blancpain Endurance Series.

Returning teams for 2011 included Sumo Power GT, Münnich Motorsport, Marc VDS Racing Team, Hexis AMR, and Young Driver AMR.  Swiss Racing Team also returned, but opted for Lamborghinis instead of their 2010 Nissans.  JR Motorsports, a partner of Sumo Power, took over the second Nissan squad, while Marc VDS sister team Belgian Racing shared representation of Ford.  The Mad-Croc Racing partnership of 2010 was divided for 2011, with DKR Engineering forming their own Corvette squad, while Selleslagh Racing Team raced under the guise of Exim Bank Team China.  Both teams were ineligible for the Teams Championship as neither had secured a second car for the start of the season.  No teams announced plans to campaign the Maserati MC12, ending seven straight seasons of competition in GT1.

During the season the Swiss Racing Team withdrew from three consecutive rounds following racing incidents at Sachsenring which damaged their two Lamborghinis, citing a lack of spare parts to repair their cars in time.  Prior to the Ordos round, Swiss Racing Team's Lamborghinis were transferred to Münnich Motorsport.  At the same time, DKR Engineering merged their outfit with Exim Bank Team China, giving Team China their first two-car entries of the season.  Münnich then took over DKR's former entry under the new title of DKR www-discount.de allowing the series to maintain an 18-car field.

Entries
On 18 March 2011 the FIA published an entry list of teams and manufacturers for the full 2011 season. All teams used Michelin tyres.

Regulation changes
Following the 2010 season, three major changes were made to the GT1 regulations.  Teams would now have six sets of tyres made available to them at each event, increased from the previous limit of four. Starting with the second event of the season, two of the tyres would be previously used sets from the previous event in the season, available throughout the weekend. Two fresh sets were given to the teams at the start of the first practice session, while the final two fresh sets were available prior to the warm-up session.

Two of the regulation changes involved the allocation of championship points in the qualifying race, with points now awarded to the top six finishers instead of only the top three. Further, the winner of the qualifying race would earn  of success ballast for the next event in the championship, while second place was given . The ninth place finisher in the qualifying race would lose 5 kg of success ballast, while any car finishing tenth or lower had 10 kg removed.

Results and standings

Race results

Championships
Championship points were awarded for the first six positions in each qualifying race and for the first ten positions in each championship race. Entries were required to complete 75% of the winning car's race distance in order to be classified and earn points. Individual drivers were required to participate for a minimum of 25 minutes in order to earn championship points in any race.

Drivers' Championship

Teams' Championship

The Exim Bank Team China and DKR Engineering teams were deemed ineligible for the Teams' Championship after failing to provide two cars each for the full season as required by series regulations.

References

External links
 FIA GT1 World Championship

 
FIA GT1